Worse Creek is a stream in the U.S. state of Georgia. It is a tributary to the Chattooga River.

Worse Creek was so named on account rough terrain near its course, cf. nearby Bad Creek.

References

Rivers of Georgia (U.S. state)
Rivers of Rabun County, Georgia